Tibor Živković (11 March 1966 – 26 March 2013) was a Serbian historian and Byzantinist who specialised in the period of the Early Middle Ages.

Biography
Živković was born in Mostar, and studied history at the Faculty of Philosophy at the University of Belgrade, graduating in 1990 from the Department of Antiquity. He earned his MA in 1996 with the thesis Slavizacija na teritoriju Srbije VII-XI stoljeća (Slavicization on the territory of Serbia 7th–11th centuries), and his PhD in 2000 with the dissertation Slavs under Byzantine rule from the 7th to 11th Centuries (until 1025). During his doctoral studies, from 1997 to 1999, he was the recipient of a scholarship from the Government of Greece; he conducted postdoctoral research at the Institute for Byzantine Research of the National Hellenic Research Foundation on a fellowship from the Ministry of Science and Technological Development of Serbia.

As of 1997, he worked at the Institute of History of the Serbian Academy of Sciences and Arts (SANU), where he was the director from 2002 to 2010, as well as editor in chief of the Drafting Committee for its editions.

He was a team leader in archaeological excavations along the Ibar River between 2003 and 2009, and taught general medieval studies in the Faculty of Philosophy at the University of Banja Luka.

Publications
Živković published extensively. His field of research encompassed the early medieval history of the South Slavs on the territories of Serbia, Bosnia, Croatia, Bulgaria, and Greece. His focus of interest was the history of the Serbs during that period, but he also gave new insights on the De Administrando Imperio (arguing that the chapters on the Croats and Serbs were in large part based on a lost source written by Anastasius Bibliothecarius in the late 9th century, hypothetically called De conversione Croatorum et Serborum) and the Chronicle of the Priest of Duklja (Gesta Regum Sclavorum), the early ecclesiastical history of the Serbian territory and its rulers.

Books

References

External links

Tibor Živković at Academia.edu

1966 births
2013 deaths
20th-century Serbian historians
Writers from Mostar
Writers from Belgrade
Serbian medievalists
Serbs of Bosnia and Herzegovina
Balkan studies
Serbian Byzantinists
Scholars of Byzantine history
21st-century Serbian historians